The 2006 Pacific Cup was the 10th Pacific Cup, a rugby league tournament held between Pacific teams. The tournament was hosted in Auckland and eventually won by Tonga, who defeated Fiji in the final. Fiji's Asaeli Saravaki was the Player of the Tournament.

Squads
Tonga, Cook Islands, New Zealand Māori and Tokelau squads comprised players mainly involved in New Zealand’s domestic Bartercard Cup and lower grades.

The New Zealand Māori side was coached by Dean Clark and included Paul Atkins, Willie Heta, Darren Kingi, Jared Trott, Matt Wanoa and Steve Skinnon.

Tongan squad included Taniela Moa, Joel Taufa'ao, Enele Taufa, Kosilio Tonga'uiha, Makasini Richter, Ukuma Ta’ai, Willie Wolfgramm and Kimi Uasi.

The Cook Islands included Sam Mataora.

Tokelau replaced New Caledonia who pulled out a week before the tournament.

The Fijian squad was a mix of local and overseas based players . While the majority of players were converts from rugby union the team also included Alipate Tani and Semisi Tora.

Toa Samoa was the only team at the tournament to comprise entirely of indigenous local players. The intention of the Samoan Rugby League was to develop and expose local players with an eye to the 2008 World Cup qualifiers later in the year.

Results

Pool A

Pool B

Playoffs

Fifth place play-off

Third place play-off

Final

References

Oceania Cup
Pacific Cup
2006
Pacific Cup